Viktória Győri-Lukács (born 31 October 1995) is a Hungarian handballer for Győri ETO KC and the Hungarian national team.

Achievements
Nemzeti Bajnokság I:
Winner: 2015, 2022
Magyar Kupa:
Winner: 2017, 2021
EHF Cup Winners' Cup:
Winner: 2012

Individual awards
All-Star Team Best Right Wing of the EHF Champions League: 2021

Personal life
She is married to fellow handballer, Mátyás Győri.

References

External links

1995 births
Living people
Handball players from Budapest
Hungarian female handball players
Ferencvárosi TC players (women's handball)
Siófok KC players
Győri Audi ETO KC players
Handball players at the 2020 Summer Olympics
20th-century Hungarian women
21st-century Hungarian women